Larry Rivers (born Yitzroch Loiza Grossberg) (1923 – 2002) was an American artist, musician, filmmaker, and occasional actor. Considered by many scholars to be the "Godfather" and "Grandfather" of Pop art, he was one of the first artists to merge non-objective, non-narrative art with narrative and objective abstraction.

Career

Larry Rivers was born as Yitzroch Loiza Grossberg in the Bronx, New York in the family of Jewish immigrants from Ukraine. Rivers took up painting in 1945 and studied at the Hans Hofmann School from 1947–48. He earned a BA in art education from New York University in 1951.

His work was quickly acquired by the Museum of Modern Art. A 1953 painting Washington Crossing the Delaware was damaged in fire at the museum five years later.

He was a pop artist of the New York School, reproducing everyday objects of American popular culture as art. He was one of eleven New York artists featured in the opening exhibition at the Terrain Gallery in 1955.

He has been contextualised as working out of the Abstract expressionist legacy of Willem de Kooning, "adapting the freedom of the Abstract Expressionist technique towards figurative ends."

During the early 1960s Rivers lived in the Hotel Chelsea, notable for its artistic residents such as Bob Dylan, Janis Joplin, Leonard Cohen, Arthur C. Clarke, Dylan Thomas, Sid Vicious and multiple people associated with Andy Warhol's Factory and where he brought several of his French nouveau réalistes friends like Yves Klein who wrote there in April 1961 his Manifeste de l'hôtel Chelsea, Arman, Martial Raysse, Jean Tinguely, Niki de Saint-Phalle, Christo, Daniel Spoerri or Alain Jacquet, several of whom, like Rivers, left some pieces of art in the lobby of the hotel for payment of their rooms. In 1965, Rivers had his first comprehensive retrospective in five important American museums. 

His final work for the exhibition was The History of the Russian Revolution, which was later on extended permanent display at the Hirshhorn Museum and Sculpture Garden in Washington, DC. He spent 1967 in London collaborating with the American painter Howard Kanovitz.

In 1967, Rivers traveled to Africa for a second time with Pierre Dominique Gaisseau to finish their documentary Africa and I, which was a part of the groundbreaking NBC series Experiments in Television. During this trip they narrowly escaped execution as suspected mercenaries.  

During the 1970s, Rivers worked closely with Diana Molinari and Michel Auder on many video tape projects, including the infamous Tits, and also worked in neon.

Rivers's legs appeared in John Lennon and Yoko Ono's 1971 film Up Your Legs Forever.

Music
Between 1940 and 1945, he worked as a jazz saxophonist in New York City; he changed his name to Larry Rivers in 1940 after being introduced as "Larry Rivers and the Mudcats". He studied at the Juilliard School of Music in 1945–46, along with Miles Davis, with whom he remained friends until Davis's death in 1991.

Personal life
Larry Rivers was born in the Bronx to Samuel and Sonya Grossberg, Jewish immigrants from Ukraine. He changed his name to Rivers in 1940 at the start of his career as jazz saxophonist. 

In 1945, he married Augusta Berger, and they had one son, Steven. Rivers also adopted Berger's son from a previous relationship, Joseph, and reared both children after the couple divorced. He lived with his mother-in-law, Berdie Burger, who was a favourite model of his, in Southampton, Long Island from 1953-57.

In 1961, he married Clarice Price, a Welsh school teacher who cared for his two sons. The relationship lasted six years before the two separated. In their time together, however, the pair had two daughters, Gwynne and Emma.

Shortly after, he lived and collaborated with Diana Molinari, who featured in many of his works of the 1970s.

Rivers then lived with Sheila Lanham, a Baltimore artist and poet.

In the early 1980s, Rivers and East Village figurative painter Daria Deshuk lived together and in 1985 they had a son, Sam Deshuk Rivers (now Sam D. Rivers).

Rivers also maintained a relationship with poet Frank O'Hara in the late 1950s and delivered the eulogy at O'Hara's funeral in 1966.

Throughout his career, Rivers maintained studios in New York City, Southampton, Long Island, and Zihuatanejo, Mexico.

Rivers died in 2002, leaving behind his five children and then companion poet Jeni Olin.

Legacy
His primary gallery was the Marlborough Gallery in New York City. In 2002, a major retrospective of Rivers' work was held at the Corcoran Gallery of Art in Washington, D.C. New York University bought correspondences and other documents from the Larry Rivers Foundation to house in their archive. However, his daughters Gwynne and Emma objected to one particular film being displayed, as it depicts them naked as children and adolescents. The film's purpose is supposedly the documentation of their growth through puberty, but it was made when they were not consenting adults. The matter was addressed in the December 2010 issue of the magazine Vanity Fair, and the October 2010 issue of Grazia. The film will never be publicly displayed as requested by both children.

See also
 Bodley Gallery
 LGBT culture in New York City
 List of LGBT people from New York City

References

Further reading
 Baskind, Samantha, Jewish Artists and the Bible in Twentieth-Century America,Philadelphia, PA, Penn State University Press, 2014, 
 Marika Herskovic, New York School Abstract Expressionists Artists Choice by Artists, (New York School Press, 2000.) . p. 8; p. 32; p. 38; p. 310–313

External links
101 / EXHIBIT
Marlborough Gallery
Frank O'Hara — Rainbow Warrior

1923 births
2002 deaths
Jewish painters
Jewish American artists
American pop artists
People from the Bronx
People from Manhattan
Artists from the Bronx
20th-century American painters
American male painters
Bisexual artists
20th-century American printmakers
American expatriates in Mexico
20th-century American Jews
21st-century American Jews
20th-century LGBT people
20th-century American male artists